In Major League Baseball (MLB), the 40–40 club is the group of batters who have collected 40 home runs and 40 stolen bases in a single season.  Jose Canseco was the first to achieve this, doing so in 1988 after having predicted the feat in April of that year.  The most recent player to reach the milestone is Alfonso Soriano, achieving the feat during the 2006 season.

In total, only four players have reached the 40–40 club in MLB history and none have done so more than once.  Of these, three were right-handed batters and one was left-handed.  Two players—Barry Bonds and Alex Rodriguez—are also members of the 600 home run club. Jose Canseco is the only player to have won the MVP Award in the same year of his 40–40 season. Bonds finished 5th in the league on the MVP ballot, Soriano 6th and Rodriguez 9th, the seasons in which they accomplished the 40–40. Canseco is also the only one to lead his club to the postseason, making it to the World Series.  Alfonso Soriano collected 41 doubles alongside achieving 40–40.  Rodriguez is the only non-outfielder to attain 40–40.
All four 40–40 club members had at least 400 career home runs and 200 stolen bases. Canseco, Bonds and Soriano obtained the 40th base after already having 40 home runs for the season. Rodríguez had 40 stolen bases before his 40th home run. 
Both Soriano (39-41 in ‘02) and Bonds (40-37 in ‘97) got close to having multiple 40–40 seasons. Canseco’s next closest 40–40 season was 1998 (46-29). Rodriguez hit 40 home runs on seven other occasions but never stole more than 24 bases in any of those years.

Becoming a member of the 40–40 club is an elusive achievement in modern American baseball, as very few players possess both the power to hit 40 home runs and the speed to steal 40 bases in a season. Generally a player with the strength to hit 40 home runs will not have the speed necessary to steal 40 bases, and vice versa. This remains true even as statistical trends change in the MLB — stolen base totals in the 1980s were unusually high, but very few players reached 40 home runs; home run totals were extremely high in the late 1990s, but stolen bases became more rare as the steal was a sparingly-used tactic. 

Due to the modernity of the 40–40 club, as well as the links to the use of performance-enhancing drugs by Bonds, Canseco and Rodriguez, no eligible club members have been elected to the Baseball Hall of Fame.  Eligibility requires that a player has "been retired five seasons" or deceased for at least six months. With Rodriguez's retirement in 2016, there are no active players that have achieved a 40–40 season. Soriano fell off the Hall of Fame ballot in his first year of eligibility in 2020. Bonds made it to 10 years on the ballot but ultimately fell short in 2022, his final year of eligibility.

Bonds and Canseco were both implicated in the December 2007 Mitchell Report, while Rodriguez admitted in 2009 to using steroids. Soriano is also the only player to achieve the feat while playing at home. After stealing a base in an October 2, 2015 game for the NC Dinos, first baseman Eric Thames became the first player to join the Korea Baseball Organization's 40–40 club.

Members

Near-misses
The first player to approach the mark was Ken Williams in 1922, with 39 home runs and 37 stolen bases, thus making him the first player to reach the 30–30 club.  It took another 30 years for another player to come close to 40–40, as Willie Mays did in 1956 with 36 home runs and 40 stolen bases.  Bobby Bonds hit his 38th home run of the season on September 9, 1973, but came up one home run shy of becoming the founding member of the club after hitting just one home run in the Giants' final 21 games.

In 1987, Eric Davis of the Cincinnati Reds missed becoming the first player to accomplish 40–40, falling 3 home runs short, when he hit 37 home runs and stole 50 bases. 
When Canseco predicted he would reach 40–40 in 1988, he mistakenly assumed "five or six players must have done it." After Canseco became the first member of the club, Hall of Famer Mickey Mantle was quoted as saying, "Hell, If I'd known 40–40 was going to be a big deal, I'd have done it every year!"  Mantle's career best for stolen bases in a single season was 21.

In 2002, both Vladimir Guerrero of the Montreal Expos and Alfonso Soriano of the New York Yankees were only one home run short of reaching 40–40 after achieving 39, with 40 stolen bases. In 2004, Carlos Beltrán was two home runs shy as he hit 38 and collected 42 steals, splitting the season between the Kansas City Royals and Houston Astros. In 2011, Matt Kemp came up one home run shy, as he hit 39 and stole 40 bases.

In 2019, Braves outfielder Ronald Acuña Jr. barely missed the 40–40 club, hitting 41 home runs and stealing 37 bases before his season ended prematurely due to an injury.

Below are players that had come the closest, having 40 or more in one category and 35 or more in the other, without reaching 40.

See also

 20–20–20 club, similar multiple stat club for doubles, triples and home runs.
 30–30 club, 30 home runs and 30 stolen bases
 Baseball statistics
 Triple Crown

Notes

References
General

Specific

Major League Baseball statistics
Major League Baseball lists